Vivian Aminu Yusuf (born 8 August 1983) is a Nigerian judoka, who played for the half-heavyweight category. She won two silver medals at the 2007 All-Africa Games in Algiers, Algeria, and at the 2008 African Judo Championships in Agadir, Morocco, both losing out to Tunisia's Houda Miled in the final match.

Yusuf represented Nigeria at the 2008 Summer Olympics in The Games of the XXIX Olympiad in Beijing, China, where she competed for the women's half-heavyweight class (78 kg). She received a bye for the second preliminary round, before losing out to Germany's Heide Wollert, who was able to score an automatic ippon at thirty-seven seconds.

References

External links

NBC 2008 Olympics profile

Living people
Olympic judoka of Nigeria
Judoka at the 2008 Summer Olympics
1983 births
Nigerian female judoka
African Games silver medalists for Nigeria
African Games medalists in judo
Competitors at the 2007 All-Africa Games
20th-century Nigerian women
21st-century Nigerian women